William Bourke Cockran (February 28, 1854March 1, 1923), commonly known as Bourke Cockran or Burke Cochran in contemporary reports, was an Irish-American politician and orator. He served as a United States representative from the East Side of Manhattan for seven terms.

He was a leading orator of the late 19th and early 20th century. Through his personal relationship with the Churchill family, he was an important, early influence on British statesman Winston Churchill.

Early life and education
William Bourke Cockran was born in Carrowkeel in County Sligo, Ireland on February 28, 1854. He was educated in France and in his native Ireland.

He emigrated to Westchester County, New York at seventeen years of age. There, he taught in a private academy and became principal of a public school.

He studied law and was admitted to the bar in 1876. He first practiced in Mount Vernon, New York, but moved to New York City in 1878 and continued practice there.

Political career

Beginning in 1886, Cockran, a Democrat, was a frequent candidate for the U.S. House of Representatives and won several non-consecutive terms.

Cockran was a member of the commission to revise the judiciary article of the New York Constitution in 1890.

In 1896, Cockran publicly broke with the Democratic Party, opposing the Free Silver platform of presidential candidate William Jennings Bryan. Cockran campaigned instead for Republican William McKinley, helping to bring Gold Democrats over to McKinley's winning coalition.

In 1900, Cockran returned to the Democratic Party, supporting Bryan's second presidential campaign.

In 1904, Cockran won a special election return to the House in the empty seat of George B. McClellan Jr., who had resigned to become mayor of New York City. He was elected to three more full terms.

In 1920, Cockran delivered the nominating speech for Al Smith at the Democratic National Convention. Later that year, he was elected to his final term in the House of Representatives.

Personal life
Cockran was a devout Roman Catholic and became deeply involved in support of Irish nationalism.

Alice Roosevelt Longworth recalled Cockran as "an Anglophobe in public and an Anglomaniac in private."

In 1901, he was awarded the Laetare Medal by the University of Notre Dame, the oldest and most prestigious award for American Catholics.

The Churchills
Cockran was a friend of Britain's Churchill family and reputed one-time lover of Jennie Churchill.

In 1895, he introduced Jennie's 20-year-old son, Winston Churchill, to American high society during Churchill's first trip to New York. Years later, Churchill credited Cockran as his first political mentor and the chief role model for his own success as an orator.

Churchill wrote in the 1930s that Cockran was, "A pacifist, individualist, democrat, capitalist, and a 'Gold-bug'....He was equally opposed to socialists, inflationist, and Protectionists, and he resisted them on all occasions." Churchill never became a pacifist but he did adopt all the rest of Cockran's stances during his own political career, and carefully read and reread his speeches for oratorical advice.  Churchill quoted Cockran in his 1946 "Iron Curtain speech" recalling: “words which I learned 50 years ago from a great Irish-American orator, a friend of mine, Mr Bourke Cockran: ‘There is enough for all. The earth is a generous mother. She will provide, in plentiful abundance, food for all her children, if they will but cultivate her soil in justice and in peace.’”

Death
He served his final years, 1921–1923, as a congressman, dying in Washington, D.C. He is buried in Gate of Heaven Cemetery, Hawthorne, New York.

See also
List of United States Congress members who died in office (1900–49)

References

Further reading
 Gibson, Florence E. The attitudes of the New York Irish toward state and national affairs, 1848-1892 (AMS Press, 1951).
 Kennedy, Ambrose. American Orator: Bourke Cockran; His Life and Politics (1948). 225 pp. 
 McElroy, Robert, ed. In The Name Of Liberty: Selected Addresses Of William Bourke Cockran (1925)
 McGurrin, James. Bourke Cockran: a free lance in American politics (Arno Press, 1972). Online review
 Stovall, Richard Lee. "The rhetoric of Bourke Cockran: a contextual analysis" (PhD dissertation, The Ohio State University, 1975).  Online

External links

Mrs. Bourke Cockran on woman suffrage From a scrapbook in the Carrie Chapman Catt Collection in the Rare Book and Special Collection Division at the Library of Congress

1854 births
1923 deaths
American Roman Catholics
Burials at Gate of Heaven Cemetery (Hawthorne, New York)
Cockran, W. Bourke
Cockran, W. Bourke
People from County Sligo
Politicians from County Sligo
Laetare Medal recipients
Democratic Party members of the United States House of Representatives from New York (state)